Wesley Cody McLeod (born June 26, 1984) is a Canadian former professional ice hockey winger currently serving as a player development coach for the Minnesota Wild of the National Hockey League. As an undrafted player, McLeod previously played in the National Hockey League for the Colorado Avalanche, Nashville Predators, and New York Rangers. McLeod was best known for his role as a tough, physical forward.

Playing career
McLeod was a fourth-round WHL Bantam Draft pick for the Portland Winterhawks in 1999. In the 2004–05 season, his fourth and final year with the Winterhawks, he scored 31 goals and 60 points.

Undrafted and looking to turn pro, McLeod attended the Boston Bruins training camp in the summer of 2005. McLeod was then reassigned to affiliate, the Providence Bruins training camp on September 17, 2005, before ultimately leaving without a contract. McLeod was signed by the Lowell Lock Monsters of the AHL for the 2005–06. He spent his first full professional season with the Monsters and their ECHL affiliate, the San Diego Gulls.

The Colorado Avalanche, as the parent club of the Monsters, signed McLeod to his first NHL contract with the Avalanche on July 6, 2006. After the Avalanche training camp for the 2006–07 season, Mcleod was assigned to new affiliate the Albany River Rats on September 19, 2006.

In the 2007–08 season, McLeod received his first NHL recall on December 16, 2007. He made his NHL debut with the Avalanche on December 19, 2007, in a 2–1 loss against the Anaheim Ducks. A week later, on December 27, he scored his first NHL goal against Dominik Hašek of the Detroit Red Wings in a 4–2 loss. McLeod dressed and played for every remaining Avalanche game after he was called up from the Lake Erie Monsters. McLeod became the first Avalanche rookie in history to record over 100 penalty minutes.

McLeod gained notoriety on April 27, 2008, the second game of the second round of the 2008 Stanley Cup Playoffs against the Detroit Red Wings by picking up the traditional octopus thrown onto the ice in the Joe Louis Arena and throwing it into the stands. McLeod scored his first playoff goal also against the Red Wings in game three on April 29, 2008. With an impressive debut season with Colorado, McLeod was re-signed by the Avalanche to a one-year deal on July 14, 2008.

In the 2008–09 season, McLeod sustained a shoulder injury in a 3–2 home loss against Detroit on March 4, 2009, causing him to miss three straight games. He ended the season third in goals on the Avs with 15, behind only Ryan Smyth and Milan Hejduk. McLeod's 162 penalty minutes were just one minute shy of team-leading Ian Laperrière. McLeod was re-signed by the Avalanche to a 3-year deal on June 19, 2009.

The 2011–12 season saw McLeod set a franchise record becoming the only player in Quebec/Colorado history to register at least 100 PIMs in five consecutive seasons. Behind only Paul Stastny and Milan Hejduk in terms of tenure currently with the club, the Avs signed the pending unrestricted free agent to another three-year contract on June 4, 2012. He was suspended five games in 2013–14 for a hit-from-behind on Detroit Red Wings defenceman Niklas Kronwall in which Kronwall received a concussion.

With Paul Stastny signing with the Blues prior to the 2014–15 season, McLeod became the current longest-tenured member of the Avalanche also serving as the club's alternate captain between 2012 and 2016. On September 30, 2014, McLeod agreed to a three-year contract extension to remain with Colorado.

In the 2016–17 season, his 10th with the Avalanche, McLeod saw limited playing time and was reduced to a depth role amongst the forwards. With the Avalanche suffering as the league's worst team through the midpoint of the season, McLeod's tenure with the club ended as he was traded to the Nashville Predators in exchange for Félix Girard on January 13, 2017. He left having played in 659 games, leading the Avalanche franchise with 1359 penalty minutes. McLeod remained in Denver, making his Predators debut the following day against his previous club. He scored his first goal with the Predators and fought against former teammate Jarome Iginla, sparking a 3–2 victory over the Avalanche on January 14, 2017.

In the 2017–18 season, McLeod was used in rotation on the fourth line by the Predators. He posted 1 goal and 1 assist in 23 games before he was placed and later claimed off waivers by the New York Rangers on January 25, 2018. He made his debut with the Rangers against the Toronto Maple Leafs, recording a game and Rangers season-high 8 hits on February 1, 2018. Adding his physicality and veteran presence to the rebuilding Rangers, he played out the season contributing with 2 assists in 25 games.

As a free agent in the off-season, McLeod agreed to remain with the Rangers, securing a one-year, $650,000 contract on July 12, 2018.

During the  2018–19 season, McLeod suffered a fractured hand in a fight against New York Islanders enforcer Ross Johnston on November 21, 2018. After 31 games with the Rangers, on February 6, he was traded back to the Nashville Predators for a 7th-round pick in 2020.

On August 26, 2019, the Minnesota Wild's AHL affiliate Iowa Wild signed McLeod to a standard AHL player contract. Entering his 16th professional year, McLeod appeared in 21 games for Iowa in the 2019–20 season collecting seven points and 41 PIM. Adding a positive veteran presence, McLeod signed a one-year extension with Iowa on July 13, 2020.

Following his third season with the Iowa Wild, captaining the club in the 2021–22 campaign, McLeod announced his retirement to end his 17-year professional career on July 11, 2022. He accepted a role within the Minnesota Wild coaching staff as a player development coach.

Career statistics

Regular season and playoffs

References

External links
 

1984 births
Living people
Albany River Rats players
Canadian ice hockey left wingers
Canadian people of Scottish descent
Colorado Avalanche players
Ice hockey people from Manitoba
Iowa Wild players
Lake Erie Monsters players
Lowell Lock Monsters players
Nashville Predators players
New York Rangers players
Portland Winterhawks players
San Diego Gulls (ECHL) players
Undrafted National Hockey League players